The 1958 Holy Cross Crusaders baseball team represented the College of the Holy Cross in the 1958 NCAA University Division baseball season. The Crusaders played their home games at Fitton Field. The team was coached by Jack Barry in his 38th year as head coach at Holy Cross.

The Crusaders won the District I playoff to advance to the College World Series, where they were defeated by the Southern California Trojans.

Roster

Schedule

|-
! style="" | Regular Season
|-

|-
! bgcolor="#DDDDFF" width="3%" | #
! bgcolor="#DDDDFF" width="7%" | Date
! bgcolor="#DDDDFF" width="14%" | Opponent
! bgcolor="#DDDDFF" width="25%" | Site/Stadium
! bgcolor="#DDDDFF" width="5%" | Score
! bgcolor="#DDDDFF" width="5%" | Overall Record
|- align="center" bgcolor="#ffcccc"
|  || April 19 ||  || Fitton Field • Worcester, Massachusetts || 4–6 || –
|- align="center" bgcolor="#ccffcc"
| || April 24 ||  || Unknown • Unknown || 5–2 || –
|-

|-
! bgcolor="#DDDDFF" width="3%" | #
! bgcolor="#DDDDFF" width="7%" | Date
! bgcolor="#DDDDFF" width="14%" | Opponent
! bgcolor="#DDDDFF" width="25%" | Site/Stadium
! bgcolor="#DDDDFF" width="5%" | Score
! bgcolor="#DDDDFF" width="5%" | Overall Record
|- align="center" bgcolor="#ccffcc"
| || May 10 ||  || Fitton Field • Worcester, Massachusetts || 11–3 || –
|- align="center" bgcolor="#ccffcc"
| || May 21 ||  || Unknown • Unknown || 10–0 || –
|-

|-
! style="" | Postseason
|-

|-
! bgcolor="#DDDDFF" width="3%" | #
! bgcolor="#DDDDFF" width="7%" | Date
! bgcolor="#DDDDFF" width="14%" | Opponent
! bgcolor="#DDDDFF" width="25%" | Site/Stadium
! bgcolor="#DDDDFF" width="5%" | Score
! bgcolor="#DDDDFF" width="5%" | Overall Record
|- align="center" bgcolor="#ccffcc"
| 18 || June 4 || vs  || Unknown • Springfield, Massachusetts || 4–3 || 14–4
|- align="center" bgcolor="#ccffcc"
| 19 || June 4 || vs Colby || Unknown • Springfield, Massachusetts || 5–1 || 15–4
|- align="center" bgcolor="#ccffcc"
| 20 || June 8 || vs Connecticut || Unknown • Springfield, Massachusetts || 2–1 || 16–4
|-

|-
! bgcolor="#DDDDFF" width="3%" | #
! bgcolor="#DDDDFF" width="7%" | Date
! bgcolor="#DDDDFF" width="14%" | Opponent
! bgcolor="#DDDDFF" width="25%" | Site/Stadium
! bgcolor="#DDDDFF" width="5%" | Score
! bgcolor="#DDDDFF" width="5%" | Overall Record
|- align="center" bgcolor="#ccffcc"
| 21 || June 14 || vs Southern California || Omaha Municipal Stadium • Omaha, Nebraska || 3–0 || 17–4
|- align="center" bgcolor="#ccffcc"
| 22 || June 15 || vs Clemson || Omaha Municipal Stadium • Omaha, Nebraska || 17–4 || 18–4
|- align="center" bgcolor="#ffcccc"
| 23 || June 16 || vs Missouri || Omaha Municipal Stadium • Omaha, Nebraska || 1–4 || 18–5
|- align="center" bgcolor="#ffcccc"
| 24 || June 17 || vs Southern California || Omaha Municipal Stadium • Omaha, Nebraska || 2–6 || 18–6
|-

|-
|

Awards and honors 
Ken Komodzinski
College World Series All-Tournament Team

References

Holy Cross Crusaders baseball seasons
Holy Cross Crusaders baseball
College World Series seasons
Holy Cross